North Riverside is a village in Cook County, Illinois, United States. As of the 2020 census, it had a population of 7,426.

Geography 
North Riverside is located at  (41.846222, -87.829585).

Demographics 
As of the 2020 census there were 7,426 people, 2,626 households, and 1,681 families residing in the village. The racial makeup of the village was 58.50% White, 7.04% African American, 1.24% Native American, 3.10% Asian, 13.79% from other races, and 16.33% from two or more races. Hispanic or Latino of any race were 36.18% of the population.

There were 2,626 households, out of which 45.89% had children under the age of 18 living with them, 38.00% were married couples living together, 17.25% had a female householder with no husband present, and 35.99% were non-families. 31.57% of all households were made up of individuals, and 16.41% had someone living alone who was 65 years of age or older. The average household size was 3.10 and the average family size was 2.44.

The village's age distribution consisted of 20.4% under the age of 18, 10.1% from 18 to 24, 25% from 25 to 44, 25.9% from 45 to 64, and 18.6% who were 65 years of age or older. The median age was 39.3 years. For every 100 females, there were 106.5 males. For every 100 females age 18 and over, there were 113.7 males.

The median income for a household in the village was $55,879, and the median income for a family was $72,545. Males had a median income of $44,607 versus $41,795 for females. The per capita income for the village was $35,963. About 4.5% of families and 5.8% of the population were below the poverty line, including 4.8% of those under age 18 and 1.3% of those age 65 or over.

Government 
North Riverside is divided between three congressional districts. The area east of the Des Plaines River is in Illinois's 3rd congressional district; the area west of 1st Avenue is in the 7th district; the area between 1st Avenue and the river, consisting almost entirely of the western half of the Riverside Golf Club, is in the 4th district.

The Village of North Riverside is governed by a Village President (also referred to a Mayor), Village Clerk, and six Trustees who are all elected to four year terms.  The terms are staggered, with elections being held in odd number years.  The Mayor and Board of Trustees exercise policy-making and legislative powers of the Village, including adopting ordinances and resolutions, approving the Village’s annual appropriation and operating budget and enacting tax levies.  In addition, the Village Board receives findings and recommendations from a number of appointed citizen advisory committees.

An Illinois state appeals court ruled in 2016 that the village must pay into the fire and police pensions. The village had argued that it was unable to contribute to the pension plans because of economic hardship during the Great Recession, which lowered tax revenues. The state Department of Insurance determined that the village had not contributed to its police and firefighter pension funds for several years prior to 2013. The state ordered the village to pay into the pensions, and instead the village filed a lawsuit in Cook County Circuit Court in 2014. The judge ruled against the village, and the village appealed.

Education 
North Riverside is split into two educational districts.  First Avenue, IL-171, serves as the dividing line.  Komarek School District 94 serves the population on the west side of First Avenue and Riverside School District 96 serves the population on the east side of First Avenue.

Shopping

North Riverside Park Mall 
North Riverside Park Mall is located at 7501 W. Cermak Road. The mall features three department store anchors (Sears, JCPenney, and Carson Pirie Scott) as well as 130 specialty shops. In addition, the food court, located at the main entrance to the mall, features local favorites, as well as several chain restaurants. Outside of the food court choices is Emperor's Buffet and Olive Garden.

Costco & Edward Don 
In 2011, Edward Don, a large restaurant supply company, elected to relocate to the Village of Woodridge, citing better tax incentives and issues with the property owners.  In March 2013, Costco closed on a deal with North Riverside and the property owners of the vacated Edward Don building.  Costco held their grand opening on November 25.  The property also has 4 outlots slated to be sold to other companies.

Notable persons
New York Times bestselling author Chris DeRose.

Bud Light spokes-dog's Spuds MacKenzie, portrayed by dog Honey Tree Evil Eye.

Notable events

Fire Department privatization 
In a letter dated June 19, 2014 to the residents of North Riverside, Mayor Hermanek pitched the idea of contracting the fire department positions to a private contact company, Paramedic Services of Illinois, Inc..  The Village currently contracts with the company to provide paramedic services, but the plan was to contract the fire fighter positions as well.  The plan has drawn significant opposition from the Fire Fighters Union Local 2714, as well as village residents, and department supporters.

At the July 24 Special Meeting of the Village Board to adopt the annual appropriation, there was no vote on the privatization proposal, but the Appropriation Ordinance passed by a vote of 4 to 1.  The Fiscal Year 2014-2015 (which began May 1, 2014) budget includes slashed salaries for the fire fighters.  "The negotiations are not going to go on forever," said Hermanek. "This will be done by the end of the summer."

On September 12, 2014, in a press release from the Village, Mayor Hugh Hermanek stated that he has instructed Village attorney's to file suit with the Cook County Courts, for the right to terminate the Firefighter's Contact, which expired April 30, 2014. The press release in part reads:

References

External links 
 
Landmark weekly newspaper, serving North Riverside, Riverside and Brookfield

Villages in Illinois
Villages in Cook County, Illinois
Chicago metropolitan area